The 1991 CONCACAF Cup Winners Cup was the first edition of this defunct tournament contended between 1991 and 1998.

Preliminary round

North zone

Caribbean zone

First round

Second round

Central zone

Standings

Final round

Standings

Champion

References

2
CONCACAF Cup Winners Cup